Daniel Puertas Gallardo (born 1 December 1992) is a Spanish kickboxer. He is a two-weight ISKA World champion and one-time Wu Lin Feng Tournament winner.

Kickboxing career
Gallardo took part in the 2017 Partouche Kickboxing Tour -63kg Tournament, held on October 19, 2017. He earned his place in the tournament by winning the June 10th qualification tournament, during which he scored a second-round knockout of Daniel Manzoni and a decision victory against Yetkin Ozkul. In the semifinals of the tournament proper, Gallardo won the semifinal bout against Hicham Moujtahid by a second-round technical knockout. Gallardo fought a rematch with Yetkin Ozkul in the tournament final, which he won by a first-round technical knockout.

Gallardo was scheduled to face Andrej Kevdeš for the W5 European -65kg title at W5 #42: "European League" on November 11, 2017. He won the fight by majority decision.

Gallardo was scheduled to face Cedric Castagna at Nuit Des Champions on February 24, 2018, for the ISKA World -65kg title. He won the fight by a third-round technical knockout due to low kicks.

Gallardo participated in the 2018 Kunlun Fight World -61.5kg Tournament, held at Kunlun Fight 74 on May 13, 2018. Although he was able to defeat Jiao Daobo by decision in the quarterfinals, he in turn lost a decision to Wang Wenfeng in the semifinals.

Gallardo fought the pound for pound great Takeru Segawa at K-1 World GP 2018: inaugural Cruiserweight Championship Tournament on September 24, 2018. He lost the fight by a first-round technical knockout, succumbing to a series of hooks in the third minute of the round.

Gallardo was scheduled to face Eddy Nait Slimani for the vacant La Nuit des Champions -66kg title at Nuit Des Champions 9 on November 24, 2018. Slimani won the fight by split decision.

Gallardo's losing streak extended to four fights, after he dropped a decision to Yannick Reine at Nuit Des Gladiateurs 10 on January 19, 2019.

Gallardo was scheduled to face Filippos Petaroudis at Empire League Team II on April 6, 2019. He won the fight by a second-round technical knockout.

Gallardo was scheduled to fight Zheng Junfeng in the semifinals of the 2019 Wu Lin Feng Contender Tournament. He won the fight by unanimous decision, and faced Phittaya in the finals. Gallardo won the final bout by a first-round technical knockout.

Gallardo was scheduled to face Panpayak Jitmuangnon at ONE Championship: NextGen III on October 29, 2021. He lost the fight by unanimous decision.

Gallardo faced Jiduo Yibu at ONE: Full Circle on February 25, 2022. He won the fight by split decision.

Gallardo was scheduled to face Rodtang Jitmuangnon on January 14, 2023, at ONE Fight Night 6. However, Puertas was rescheduled to face Superlek Kiatmuu9 for the vacant ONE Flyweight Kickboxing World Championship. He lost the fight via unanimous decision.

Titles

World Kickboxing League
 2014 WKL Pro Spanish Champion 

Wu Lin Feng
 2016 Wu Lin Feng -60kg Champion

Partouche Kickboxing Tour
 2017 Partouche Kickboxing Tour -63kg Champion

W5
 2017 W5 European -65kg Champion

International Sport Karate Association
 2015 ISKA World K-1 -60kg Champion
 2018 ISKA World K-1 -65kg Champion

Kickboxing record 
{{Kickboxing record start||norec=y|title=Kickboxing record|record=32 Wins (12 (T)KO's), 9 Losses}}
|-  style="background:#fbb;"
| 2023-01-14 || Loss||align=left| Superlek Kiatmuu9 || ONE Fight Night 6 || Bangkok, Thailand || Decision (Unanimous) || 5 || 3:00 
 |-
! style=background:white colspan=9 |
|- style="background:#cfc"
| 2022-02-25 || Win ||align=left| Jiduo Yibu || ONE: Full Circle || Kallang, Singapore || Decision (Split) || 3 || 3:00  
|- align="center" bgcolor="#fbb"
| 2021-10-29|| Loss ||align=left| Panpayak Jitmuangnon || ONE Championship: NextGen III || Kallang, Singapore || Decision (Unanimous) || 3 || 3:00 

|-  style="text-align:center; background:#cfc;"
| 2019-09-28|| Win||align=left| Phittaya|| WLF -67kg World Cup 2019-2020 4th Group Stage Contender Tournament Final || Zhengzhou, China || TKO (Punches) || 1 || 

|-  style="text-align:center; background:#cfc;"
| 2019-09-28|| Win||align=left| Zheng Junfeng || WLF -67kg World Cup 2019-2020 4th Group Stage Contender Tournament Semi Final || Zhengzhou, China || Decision (Unanimous)|| 3 || 3:00 

|-  style="text-align:center; background:#cfc;"
| 2019-04-06|| Win||align=left| Filippos Petaroudis|| Empire League Team II || Spain || TKO (Referee Stoppage)||2  || 

|- align="center" bgcolor="#fbb"
| 2019-01-19 || Loss  ||align=left| Yannick Reine || Nuit Des Gladiateurs 10 || Marseille, France || Decision  || 3 || 3:00

|- align="center" bgcolor="#fbb"
| 2018-11-24 || Loss  ||align=left| Eddy Nait Slimani ||  Nuit Des Champions || Marseille, France || Decision (Split)  || 5 || 3:00
|-
! style=background:white colspan=9 |

|- align="center"  bgcolor="#fbb"
| 2018-09-24 || Loss || align=left| Takeru || K-1 World GP 2018: inaugural Cruiserweight Championship Tournament || Saitama, Japan || KO (Punches) || 1 || 2:08      

|-  style="text-align:center; background:#fbb;"
| 2018-05-13|| Loss ||align=left| Wang Wenfeng || Kunlun Fight 74 World -61.5kg Tournament, Semi Finals || Jinan, China || Decision || 3 || 3:00

|-  style="text-align:center; background:#cfc;"
| 2018-05-13|| Win||align=left| Jiao Daobo || Kunlun Fight 74 World -61.5kg Tournament, Quarter Finals || Jinan, China || Decision || 3 || 3:00

|- align="center" bgcolor="#cfc"
| 2018-02-24 || Win  ||align=left| Cedric Castagna ||  Nuit Des Champions || Vitrolles, France || TKO (Low Kicks)|| 3 || 
|-
! style=background:white colspan=9 |

|- align="center" bgcolor="#cfc"
| 2017-11-11 || Win  ||align=left| Andrej Kedveš || W5 #42: "European League" || Kosice, Slovakia || Decision (Majority) || 5 || 3:00 
|-
! style=background:white colspan=9 |

|-  style="text-align:center; background:#cfc;"
| 2017-10-19 || Win ||align=left| Yetkin Ozkul  || Partouche Kickboxing Tour -63kg Tournament Final || La Tour-de-Salvagny, France || TKO (Ref. stop/High knee) || 1 || 2:48
|-
! style=background:white colspan=9 |

|-  style="text-align:center; background:#cfc;"
| 2017-10-19 || Win ||align=left| Hicham Moujtahid  || Partouche Kickboxing Tour -63kg Tournament Semi Final || La Tour-de-Salvagny, France || TKO || 2 || 

|-  style="text-align:center; background:#cfc;"
| 2017-06-10 || Win ||align=left| Yetkin Ozkul  || Partouche Kickboxing Tour -63kg Qualification Tournament Final || Bandol, France || Decision || 3 || 3:00

|-  style="text-align:center; background:#cfc;"
| 2017-06-10 || Win ||align=left| Daniel Manzoni || Partouche Kickboxing Tour -63kg Qualification Tournament Semi Final || Bandol, France || KO|| 3 || 

|-  style="text-align:center; background:#cfc;"
| 2017-05-06|| Win||align=left|  Chen Wende || Wu Lin Feng 2017: China VS USA, -63kg Tournament Group B Final|| Zhengzhou, China || KO || 2 || 

|-  style="text-align:center; background:#cfc;"
| 2017-05-06|| Win||align=left|  Chin Ngaichung || Wu Lin Feng 2017: China VS USA, -63kg Tournament Group B Semi Final|| Zhengzhou, China || KO || 1 || 

|- align="center" bgcolor="#cfc"
| 2016-10-29 || Win ||align=left| Sergio Wielzen || KO Fighters 2 || Spain || Decision || 3 || 3:00

|- align="center" bgcolor="#cfc"
| 2016-06-18 || Win ||align=left|  Khyzer Hayat || KO Fighters Series || Córdoba, Spain || Decision || 3 || 3:00

|-  style="text-align:center; background:#cfc;"
| 2016-04-30|| Win||align=left| Wang Zhiwei|| Wu Lin Feng  || Zhengzhou, China || Ext.R Decision || 4 || 3:00

|- align="center"  bgcolor="#fbb"
| 2016-03-05 || Loss ||align=left| Karim Bennoui|| MFC 4|| Saint-Priest, France || Decision || 5 || 3:00

|- align="center"  bgcolor="#cfc"
| 2016-02-13 || Win ||align=left| Mikael Peynaud ||  Ultimatum Fight Night|| Fuengirola, Spain || Decision || 3 || 3:00

|- align="center"  bgcolor="#cfc"
| 2015-09-19 || Win ||align=left|  Ahmed Moufti ||  Enfusion Live|| Benahavís, Spain || Decision || 3 || 3:00

|- align="center" bgcolor="#FFBBBB"
| 2015-07-01 || Loss ||align=left| Petchboonchu FA Group || T-One || China || Decision || 5 || 3:00

|- align="center"  bgcolor="#cfc"
| 2015-05-16 || Win ||align=left| Carlos Campos||  International Kombat|| San Pedro de Alcántara, Spain || Decision || 3 || 3:00

|- align="center"  bgcolor="#cfc"
| 2015-05-10 || Win ||align=left| Anthony Ferguson||  Shock Wave 5|| Milton Keynes, United Kingdom || KO (Right hook) || 1 || 
|-
! style=background:white colspan=9 |

|-  style="text-align:center; background:#fbb;"
| 2015-03-07 || Loss ||align=left| Yetkin Ozkul  || Le Choc des Légendes|| Saint Ouen, France || Decision || 5 || 3:00

|- align="center"  bgcolor="#cfc"
| 2014-11-30 || Win ||align=left| Bruno Almeida||  Super Kombat III|| Los Palacios y Villafranca, Spain || KO || 2 || 

|- align="center"  bgcolor="#cfc"
| 2014-07-12 || Win ||align=left| Roman Skulskiy||   Enfusion Live, Final|| Mallorca, Spain || TKO || 2 || 

|- align="center"  bgcolor="#cfc"
| 2014-07-12 || Win ||align=left| Elvis Bonnin||   Enfusion Live, Semi Final|| Mallorca, Spain || TKO || 2 || 

|-
| colspan=9 | Legend''':

See also 
List of male kickboxers

References

1992 births
Living people
Spanish male kickboxers
ONE Championship kickboxers